Stephen (Steve) Field RBSA (born 3 May 1954 in Saltash, Cornwall) is an English sculptor, muralist and mosaicist, active mainly in the West Midlands, particularly the Black Country, where a number of his works are on public display. He has been resident artist and public art adviser to Dudley Metropolitan Borough Council, since 1988, and is a member of the Royal Birmingham Society of Artists, the Contemporary Glass Society and the British Association of Modern Mosaic. He coordinated Dudley's Millennium Sculpture Trail.

He studied at the University of Sheffield, earning a degree in architecture, and Wolverhampton Polytechnic, where he achieved a master's degree in fine art. He cites his influences as futurism and vorticism, the sculptor Walter Ritchie, his MPhil examiner David Harding, and the Mexican muralists.

In 1978 he painted a series of three murals on the gable ends of terraced houses at the eastern end of Heathfield Road, Handsworth, Birmingham, in conjunction with Paula Woof and Mark Renn. These murals lasted around 27 years before being overpainted by new murals. In 1982, he painted an internal mural at Frankley Community School, together with Woof and Renn. The trio worked as "The Mural Company" and were profiled in a 1982 Central Television documentary, "Round About".  In June-July 1984, Field and Renn exhibited on murals, jointly, at Bilston Museum and Art Gallery.

Field, Woof, Renn, David Patten and Derek Jones worked jointly as the West Midlands Public Art Collective, which was active circa 1987.

He received the Royal Society of Arts 'Art for Architecture' Award in 1993 and an Arts and Business Award in 2005.

Field is married to fellow muralist Cathryn Ryall, with whom he has collaborated artistically. Field has also completed several collaborations with the sculptor John McKenna.

Works 

|}

Bibliography 

Field has also written articles about his work:

References

External links 

 Field's LinkedIn profile
 Field's RBSA profile

Living people
Members and Associates of the Royal Birmingham Society of Artists
English sculptors
English male sculptors
English muralists
1954 births
Alumni of the University of Sheffield
Alumni of the University of Wolverhampton
People from Saltash